Anemplocia is a genus of moths in the family Geometridae erected by Warren in 1905.

Species
 Anemplocia flammifera (Warren, 1905)
 Anemplocia grandis (H. Druce, 1911)
 Anemplocia imparata Walker, [1865]
 Anemplocia melambathes Prout, 1923
 Anemplocia meteora Dognin, 1911
 Anemplocia scalpellata Dognin, 1911
 Anemplocia splendens (H. Druce, 1885)

References

Larentiinae
Geometridae genera